Resurrection Bay, also known as Blying Sound, and Harding Gateway in its outer reaches, is a fjord on the Kenai Peninsula of Alaska, United States. Its main settlement is Seward, located at the head of the bay. The bay received its name from Alexandr Baranov, who was forced to retreat into the bay during a bad storm in the Gulf of Alaska. When the storm settled it was Easter Sunday, so the bay and nearby Resurrection River were named in honor of it. Harding Gateway refers to the passage between Rugged and Cheval Islands.

This fortification was constructed by the United States Armed Forces to defend against a possible invasion by the Imperial Japanese Army during World War II. The bay remains ice-free even in winter, making it easily navigable.

It is called the "gateway to the Kenai Fjords" as many water taxis, kayak tours, anglers, and recreational boaters use the bay to access nearby Kenai Fjords National Park.

Geography
It contains many deep coves, most notably Thumb, Humpy, Bulldog, Pony and Derby Coves. To the west, Resurrection Bay is bordered by the Aialik Peninsula and the adjacent Aialik Bay. To the east, the bay is bounded by the Resurrection Peninsula and Day Harbor.

Parks
Several parks are located in and around the bay. Kenai Fjords National Park is primarily accessed by boat from Seward. Caines Head State Recreation Area is here. Many visit it by boat, but there is a trail from Lowell Point State Recreation Site, a  park with beach access and trailhead parking. Parts of the trail between the two parks are only accessible at low tide, so visitors must plan accordingly. Sandspit Point State Marine Park is a  undeveloped park, popular with kayakers, with beach camping and tidepooling. Sunny Cove State Marine Park is a  park on Fox Island. It is also undeveloped and has no source of fresh water. The park consists of a beach area used for camping and landing of small boats, and steep, rocky cliffs. Thumb Cove State Marine Park is one of the few developed parks in the area, featuring offshore mooring buoys for small boats, beach camping, and two public-use cabins. Visitors can view Porcupine Glacier, Spoon Glacier, and Prospect Glacier from the park.

References

Bays of Alaska
Bodies of water of Kenai Peninsula Borough, Alaska
Seward, Alaska
Kenai Mountains-Turnagain Arm National Heritage Area